Downing Industrial School, also known as Downing Shofner Institute, was a school for girls in Brewton, Alabama. The State of Alabama has a collection of photos of the school.

The school was named for a donor. The school had a string band that was photographed. The campus included C. L. Wiggins Hall. A historical marker commemorates the school's history. The Alabama Department of Archives and History has brochures from the school.

History
The school opened on September 24, 1906, and had nine girl students, three teachers, and a matron. Reverend J. M. Shofner wrote about his life and the school in a small book published in 1919.

References

Buildings and structures in Escambia County, Alabama
1906 establishments in Alabama
Defunct girls' schools in the United States